Salvador Mazza or Profesor Salvador Mazza (also known as Pocitos) is a city in northern Argentina, in Salta Province,   north of the capital city of Salta, and  from the city of Tartagal on National Route 34 in General José de San Martín Department, on the international border with Bolivia.

National Route 34 and an important railway branch of the Ferrocarril General Manuel Belgrano connect Salvador Mazza with the rest of Argentina and with Santa Cruz de la Sierra in Bolivia.

It is the northernmost city in Argentina, contrary to popular belief that La Quiaca in Jujuy Province holds that distinction.

Population 
Salvador Mazza has a population of 16,068 according to the 2001 census, which represents an increment of 71.7% over the 9,387 in 1991. It is estimated that the current population is around 25,000 inhabitants.

Name 
The name of the town has been given in honour of Salvador Mazza, an Argentine physician and epidemiologist of Italian origin, best known for his strides in helping control American trypanosomiasis an endemic disease among the rural, poor majority of early 20th century South America.

Climate

References

Populated places in Salta Province
Argentina–Bolivia border crossings
Cities in Argentina
Argentina
Salta Province